Reynolds Block, also known as the KFC Building, is an historic building in Victoria, British Columbia, Canada.  It is a two-storey ( 3 including roof) commercial building It was completed in 1889, and it stands on the northwest corner of Douglas and Yates Sts.

See also
 List of historic places in Victoria, British Columbia

References

External links
 

1889 establishments in Canada
Buildings and structures completed in 1889
Buildings and structures in Victoria, British Columbia
1889 establishments in British Columbia